The Amazon kingfisher (Chloroceryle amazona) is a species of "water kingfisher" in subfamily Cerylinae of family Alcedinidae. It is found in the lowlands of the American tropics from southern Mexico south through Central America to northern Argentina.

Taxonomy and systematics

The first formal description of the Amazon kingfisher was by the English ornithologist John Latham in 1790 under the binomial name Alcedo amazona. The current genus Chloroceryle was erected by Johann Jakob Kaup in 1848. The species is monotypic.

Description

Males weigh  and females . It has the typical kingfisher shape, with a shaggy crest and long heavy bill. The bill is black with some pale yellow at the base of the mandible and its legs and feet are dark gray. Adult males have dark bronzy green upperparts divided by a white collar. They have a white chin and throat, a rich rufous breast with dark green sides, and a white belly with dark green streaks on the side. Adult females lack the rufous breast but the green of the sides extends across the breast almost to its middle. Juvenile males have a buffy rufous breast and both sexes have buff spots on the upperwing coverts and a large yellow patch on their bill.

Distribution and habitat

The Amazon kingfisher is found from the Mexican states of Sinaloa and Tamaulipas south through Central America into Colombia and Venezuela and separately east of the Andes in every South American country except Chile, reaching as far south as central Argentina. It has been recorded as a vagrant to Aruba, Trinidad, and Texas. It inhabits large rivers, both slow- and fast-flowing, and the wooded shores of lakes and freshwater lagoons. It also occasionally occurs in brackish lagoons, mangroves, and tidal estuaries. It favors open landscapes rather than dense forest.

Behavior

Movement

The Amazon kingfisher is generally believed to be sedentary but there are records of vagrancy.

Feeding

The Amazon kingfisher usually hunts from a perch from which it dives into water for its prey. Occasionally it hovers before diving. Its diet is mostly fish, especially those of family Characidae, and crustaceans.

Breeding

The Amazon kingfisher's breeding season varies geographically. It is generally in the first half of the year in Central America but has not been detailed elsewhere. The clutch size is three or four eggs. Most incubation at night is by the female and during the day by the male. The incubation period is about 22 days and fledging occurs 29 to 30 days after hatch.

Vocalization

The Amazon kingfisher makes a "[l]oud, harsh, repeated 'tek' or 'klek'" and a "staccato 'chrit'" that may be extended into a rattle. It also makes "frog-like" calls. Another vocalization is "an accelerating series of clear notes...'see see see...su su su su'" that is thought to be a greeting or alarm call.

Status

The IUCN has assessed the Amazon kingfisher as being of Least Concern. It has an extremely large range. Its estimated population of at least a half million mature individuals is, however, believed to be decreasing. No immediate threats have been identified.

References

External links

Stamps (for Argentina, Guyana, Paraguay, Suriname, Venezuela) with RangeMap
Amazon kingfisher photo gallery VIREO 

Amazon kingfisher
Amazon kingfisher
Birds of Central America
Birds of South America
Birds of Brazil
Birds of Colombia
Birds of Venezuela
Birds of the Amazon Basin
Birds of Trinidad and Tobago
Birds of the Guianas
Birds of the Pantanal
Higher-level bird taxa restricted to the Neotropics
Amazon kingfisher
Amazon kingfisher